Mohabbataan Sachiyaan is a 2007 Pakistani Punjabi language musical romance film directed by Shehzad Rafiq and produced by Shafqat Chaudhary. The film was distributed by Geo Films in cinemas nationwide on October 14, 2007.

Plot outline 
The film is a love story highlighting the frustration and anguish of the younger generation affected by the forced decisions of their elders. The film is about a love triangle between Veena Malik, Babrik Shah and the new actor Adnan Khan.

Cast 
 Veena Malik
 Adnan Khan
 Babrak Shah
 Salman Ashraf
 Rashid Mehmood
 Naghma
 Ali Ejaz
 Zahid Saleem
 Raheela Agha

Soundtracks 
The lyrics of song Mein Jeena Tere Naal was written by Riaz ur Rehman Saghar. The album was released by Geo Films in Pakistan. Film music score is by Wajahat Attre.

Track listing

References

External links 
 

Punjabi-language Pakistani films
2007 films
2000s Punjabi-language films